The System (US: The Girl-Getters) is a 1964 British drama film directed by Michael Winner and starring Oliver Reed, Jane Merrow and Barbara Ferris.  Julie Christie was originally intended to be in the film, but she had to withdraw, and was replaced by Julia Foster. The writer was Peter Draper, who in this film popularised the word 'grockle' to mean a holiday visitor.

The film was crucial in the careers of both director Michael Winner and star Oliver Reed.

Synopsis
In the seaside village of Roxham, a group of local young men mingle among the seasonal tourists in search of sexual conquests. Near the end of one summer, the leader of the group, Tinker, a strolling photographer, aims to conquer a fashion model from a well-to-do family, but he finds himself unexpectedly falling in love. The tables thus turned, Tinker begins to see that maybe it's not the tourists who are being used in these sexual games.

Cast

 Oliver Reed as Tinker  
 Jane Merrow as Nicola  
 Barbara Ferris as Suzy  
 Julia Foster as Lorna  
 Harry Andrews as Larsey  
 Ann Lynn as Ella  
 Guy Doleman as Philip  
 Andrew Ray as Willy  
 John Porter Davison as Grib  
 Clive Colin Bowler as Sneakers  
 Iain Gregory as Sammy  
 David Hemmings as David  
 John Alderton as Nidge  
 Jeremy Burnham as Ivor
 Mark Burns as Michael 
 Derek Nimmo as James
 Derek Newark as Alfred
 Talitha Getty as Helga

Production
Extensive location filming took place in south Devon including Brixham railway station (now demolished), Brixham Harbour, Elberry Cove, Paignton Beach, Harbour, and Pier, Torquay Palm Court hotel (now demolished), and  Torquay seafront. Dartmouth, the Dartmouth ferry, Slapton Sands, and Hallsands also featured.

References

External links 
 

1964 films
1964 drama films
British drama films
British black-and-white films
Casual sex in films
1960s English-language films
Films directed by Michael Winner
Films shot in Devon
1960s British films